Pinsker is a surname. Notable people with the surname include:

 Leon Pinsker (1821–1891), Russian physician and Zionist activist
 Mark Semenovich Pinsker (1925–2003), Russian mathematician
 Scott Pinsker, filmmaker, talk show host, and author
 Simhah Pinsker (1801–1864), Polish-Jewish scholar and archeologist